Pontimicrobium is a Gram-negative, strictly aerobic, non-spore-forming, rod-shaped and non-motile genus of bacteria from the family of Flavobacteriaceae with one known species (Pontimicrobium aquaticum). Pontimicrobium aquaticum has been isolated from seawater.

References

Flavobacteria
Bacteria genera
Monotypic bacteria genera
Taxa described in 2020